Verner Bonde (8 May 1887 – 28 June 1976) was a Danish fencer. He competed in the individual foil and team sabre events at the 1920 Summer Olympics.

References

External links
 

1887 births
1976 deaths
Danish male fencers
Olympic fencers of Denmark
Fencers at the 1920 Summer Olympics
Sportspeople from the Region of Southern Denmark